Barbourula is a genus of amphibian commonly referred to as jungle toads. They are small toads of the fire-bellied toad family, Bombinatoridae, found in the Philippines and Borneo.

Species

References 
Amphibian Species of the World, Barbourula
Living Underworld, Bombinatoridae

 
Amphibian genera
Taxa named by Edward Harrison Taylor
Taxa named by Gladwyn Kingsley Noble